Rhys Gethin (died in 1405) was a key figure in the revolt of Owain Glyndŵr.  He was his standard bearer and a leading general.  His name means "swarthy Rhys".

Little is known of his life.  He had a brother, Hywel Coetmor, who also played a significant role in the rising. It is claimed that they were the grandsons of an illegitimate son of Dafydd ap Gruffydd.

He took part in the crucial Welsh victory at the Battle of Bryn Glas in 1402.  He led an army which captured several castles in South Wales. He appears to have been killed at either the Battle of Pwll Melyn or the Battle of Grosmont in 1405.

In the 20th century, his name was used as a pseudonym in statements by Meibion Glyndŵr.

References

R.R. Davies, The Revolt of Owain Glyndŵr (Rhydychen, 1995)

Welsh rebels
Year of birth missing
1405 deaths